KTYD (99.9 FM, pronounced "K-Tide") is a commercial radio station that is licensed to Santa Barbara, California and serves Santa Barbara and Ventura counties. The station is owned by Rincon Broadcasting and airs a classic rock format. KTYD is the flagship station of the nationally syndicated program Dennis Mitchell's Breakfast with the Beatles.

History
The station first signed on August 11, 1962 as KGUD-FM. It was owned by Metropolitan Theatres Corporation, which also owned the Arlington Theatre in downtown Santa Barbara, and simulcast the country and western music format of its AM sister station KGUD. In November 1967, radio and television personality Dick Clark purchased KGUD-AM-FM from Metropolitan Theatres for $195,000. He sold the combo in September 1971 to a group led by Harold S. Greenberg for $310,000.

KGUD-FM changed its call sign to KTYD in January 1973, then to KTYD-FM that September. The new call letters accompanied the introduction of a progressive freeform radio format that year under Program Director Larry Johnson, and alumni of KSJO. Early personalities included Edward Bear formerly of KSAN, Laurie Cobb from KSAN and KSJO, the morning team of Proctor and Ward, Jim Trapp, and Zeb Norris. In March 1975, Salomar Corp. sold KTYD-AM-FM to Antares Broadcasting Co., majority owned by G. David Gentling, for $279,600. KTYD-FM reverted to the KTYD call sign in September 1978.

Over the next two decades, KTYD changed hands multiple times yet remained a rock station. In January 1983, Antares Broadcasting sold the station to Robert C. Liggett, Jr. and N.L. Bentson for $1,225,000. Nearly three years later, in November 1985, Liggett and Bentson sold KTYD to New Brunswick, New Jersey-based Home News Publishing for $3.5 million. On December 16, 1992, Home News Corp. subsidiary Canalino Broadcasting Corp. sold the station to Criterion Media Group Inc. for $1.3 million; the transaction was completed the following February. In March 1997, Criterion Media Group sold KTYD and sister stations KQSB and KSBL to Jacor Communications for $13.5 million; Jacor in turn would merge with Clear Channel Communications two years later.

In January 2007, Clear Channel sold its six Santa Barbara stations, including KTYD, to Rincon Broadcasting for $17.3 million; the new owner officially took control of the cluster on January 16. Concurrent with the sale to Rincon, KTYD began streaming online.

KTYD is the originating station for the nationally syndicated program Dennis Mitchell's Breakfast with the Beatles, which airs Saturday mornings. Other syndicated programming on the station includes Little Steven's Underground Garage on Saturday nights and The Deep End with Nick Michaels on Sundays.

Translators and booster

References

External links
FCC History Cards for KTYD

TYD
Radio stations established in 1962
Classic rock radio stations in the United States
1962 establishments in California